Egness Tumbare (born 31 July 1993) is a Zimbabwean footballer who plays as a defender for Harare City Queens FC and the Zimbabwe women's national team.

Club career
Tumbare has played for Harare City in Zimbabwe. She also played for Zimbabwean club Black Rhinos Queens FC at the 2021 CAF Women's Champions League COSAFA Qualifiers.

International career
Tumbare capped for Zimbabwe at senior level during two COSAFA Women's Championship editions (2020 and 2021).

References

1993 births
Living people
Zimbabwean women's footballers
Women's association football defenders
Zimbabwe women's international footballers